José Antonio dos Santos Júnior (born 11 October 1994), known as Júnior Santos, is a Brazilian professional footballer who plays as a forward for Fortaleza.

Club career
Born in Conceição do Jacuípe, Bahia, Júnior Santos never represented any clubs as a youth. Known as Berimbau (nickname of your city), after impressing for amateur sides in his hometown, he was invited for a trial period at Osvaldo Cruz. He subsequently signed a contract with the club, and made his senior debut on 8 August 2017 by starting in a 1–1 away draw against Presidente Prudente FC for the Campeonato Paulista Segunda Divisão championship.

Júnior Santos scored his first senior goals on 25 June 2017, netting a brace in a 2–2 home draw against José Bonifácio. He finished the season with five goals in 20 appearances, as his side was knocked out in the quarterfinals.

On 11 January 2018, Júnior Santos was presented at Ituano, He made his debut for the club on 3 February 2018, coming on as a second-half substitute in a 1–1 Campeonato Paulista home draw against Ponte Preta.

Júnior Santos scored his first professional goal on 26 February 2018, netting the game's only in a home defeat of Red Bull Brasil. He finished the tournament with four goals in 11 appearances. 

On 8 April 2018, Júnior Santos was loaned to Série B side Ponte Preta until the end of the year, with a buyout clause. On his debut for the club four days later, he scored the last in a 3–0 home win against Náutico for the year's Copa do Brasil.
In 2019, Santos moved to Série A club Fortaleza on loan and was part of the team that won both the Campeonato Cearense and the Copa do Nordeste. In the latter, he was joint top-scorer in the competition scoring 8 goals in 9 games.

Career statistics

Honours

Club
Fortaleza
Campeonato Cearense: 2019
Copa do Nordeste: 2019

Kashiwa Reysol
J2 League: 2019

References

External links

Profile at Sanfrecce Hiroshima

1994 births
Living people
Sportspeople from Bahia
Brazilian footballers
Brazilian expatriate footballers
Association football forwards
Campeonato Brasileiro Série A players
Campeonato Brasileiro Série B players
J1 League players
J2 League players
Associação Atlética Ponte Preta players
Ituano FC players
Fortaleza Esporte Clube players
Kashiwa Reysol players
Yokohama F. Marinos players
Sanfrecce Hiroshima players
Botafogo de Futebol e Regatas players
Brazilian expatriate sportspeople in Japan
Expatriate footballers in Japan